Michael Francis Martin Kennedy (9 April 1961 – 9 February 2019) was a professional footballer who played in the English Football League for Halifax Town, Huddersfield Town, Middlesbrough, Portsmouth, Bradford City, Leicester City, Luton Town, Chesterfield and Wigan Athletic. Born in England, he gained two caps for Ireland during his career. Throughout his career he was renowned for his tough style of play which often left him with a poor disciplinary record.

Club career
Kennedy was born in Salford and began his career with Halifax Town making his debut in 1978–79 as the Shaymen had a poor campaign finishing in 23rd position. The 1979–80 season saw Halifax make a marginal improvement finishing in 18th place. Kennedy impressed enough with Halifax to earn a £50,000 move to Third Division Huddersfield Town. His first season at Leeds Road was a frustrating one as Huddersfield missed out on promotion by three points. In the summer of 1982 he moved to Second Division Middlesbrough for a fee of £100,000. He spent two seasons at Ayresome Park making 79 appearances before moving on again this time to south coast side Portsmouth. Pompey finished 4th in both 1984–85 and 1985–86 missing out on promotion by goal difference and then three points before finally going up in 1986–87. However, with Portsmouth having financial problems he joined Bradford City in January 1988.

After two seasons at Bradford, Kennedy had short spells with Leicester City and Luton Town before joining his old Portsmouth manager Alan Ball at Stoke City for £250,000. He made 39 appearances for Stoke in 1990–91 scoring three goals in a poor season which saw Stoke finish in their lowest ever league position of 14th in the third tier. Under the management of Lou Macari in 1991–92 Kennedy played in 26 games and was released at the end of the season. He then went on to play a season each at Chesterfield and Wigan Athletic.

International career
Kennedy earned his two international caps in the Iceland Triangular Tournament in May 1986. The competition held in Reykjavík, Iceland, with the Republic of Ireland and Czechoslovakia joining the hosts in a three team competition. Ireland beat Iceland 2–1 and Czechoslovakia 1–0 to win the trophy. Although Kennedy played well in both games, even hitting the post against Iceland with a great volley, he was never selected by Jack Charlton again. The reason being that the Manager was asked by the Czechs what he was going to do about Kennedy elbowing one of their players in the mouth when he visited their dressing room after the game "with his teeth all knocked". He never picked him again partly for this reason but also because in Tony Galvin and Kevin Sheedy he had two players who could do a better job.

Honours
 Portsmouth
 Football League Second Division runner-up: 1986–87

Republic of Ireland
 Iceland Triangular Tournament: 1986

Career statistics

Club
Source:

A.  The "Other" column constitutes appearances and goals in the EFL Trophy, Football League play-offs, and Full Members Cup.

International
Source:

References

External links
 

1961 births
2019 deaths
Footballers from Salford
English footballers
English people of Irish descent
Republic of Ireland association footballers
Republic of Ireland international footballers
Republic of Ireland under-21 international footballers
Association football midfielders
Halifax Town A.F.C. players
Huddersfield Town A.F.C. players
Middlesbrough F.C. players
Portsmouth F.C. players
Bradford City A.F.C. players
Leicester City F.C. players
Luton Town F.C. players
Stoke City F.C. players
Chesterfield F.C. players
Wigan Athletic F.C. players
English Football League players